Snobelen is a surname. Notable people with this surname include:

 John Snobelen (born 1954), Canadian politician
 Stephen Snobelen, Canadian historian